The ACW Television Championship was a secondary professional wrestling championship title in the American independent promotion Assault Championship Wrestling. The first and only champion was Scotty Charisma who won a battle royal in Waterbury, Connecticut on July 19, 2003. The championship was regularly defended throughout the state of Connecticut, and on its weekly television series Assault TV, until the promotion closed in early 2004.

Title history

Reigns

References

External links
Official ACW Television Championship Title History
ACW Television Championship at Genickbruch.com

Television wrestling championships